MHK Zelenograd is an ice hockey team in Zelenograd, Russia. They play in the Junior Hockey League Division B, the second level of Russian junior ice hockey. The club was founded in 2009.

External links
Official site

Ice hockey teams in Russia